Estonian Firefighting Museum (Estonian: Eesti Tuletõrjemuuseum) is a museum in Tallinn devoted to introducing the historical heritage of firefighting in Estonia. The first volunteer fire department in Estonia was created in 1788, by the Brotherhood of the Blackheads, which was one of the first firefighting brigades in contemporary Europe. First professional fire departments were established shortly after the end of the First World War, in 1919.

History
Estonian Firefighting Museum was established in 1974, which makes it one of the oldest active fire museums in Eastern Europe.
In 1974-2003 the museum was located in the historic fire house on Vana-Viru Street. Since 2007 the Firefighting Museum is located in the fire station on Raua Street. The exhibits consist of the antique firefighting equipment, there are currently plans to expand the museum, including to open the exhibition of fire engines and to take into use the historic tower of the fire house.

See also
Estonian Rescue Board

References

External links
 

Firefighting museums
Museums in Tallinn
Museums established in 1974
Art Nouveau architecture in Estonia